Attorney General Draper may refer to:

Thomas Draper (1864–1946), Attorney-General of Western Australia
William Henry Draper (judge) (1801–1877), Attorney-General of the Province of Canada

See also
General Draper (disambiguation)